The Scottish Consolidated Fund is the main fund operated by the Scottish Parliament.  It receives a block grant from the UK Parliament's Consolidated Fund plus the operational receipts of the Scottish Government. The fund operates under the Scotland Act 1998.

In 2010–2011, under the Barnett formula, the UK Exchequer returned a block grant of £26.8 billion of Scottish taxpayers' money to the fund.

See also
Barnett Formula
Calman Commission
Government Expenditure and Revenue Scotland
Union dividend

References

External links
	The receipts and payments account for the Scottish Consolidated fund for the period 1 April 2003 to 31 March 2004
Report on the 2006/2007 Audit, by Audit Scotland

Consolidated Fund
Scottish Government
Public finance of Scotland